Polly Walters (born Maud Walters; January 15, 1913 – March 15, 1994) was an American actress. She is best known for appearing in Smart Money (1931), Blonde Crazy (1931), Young Bride (1932). 

Walters's work in films often had her in roles of "wisecracking telephone operators and other dizzy dames in early Warner Bros. talkies". On Broadway, she portrayed Curley Flagg in She Loves Me Not (1933), Lulu Johnson in The Body Beautiful (1935), Peaches La Fleur in Red, Hot and Blue (1936) and Miss Hook in The Life of Reilly (1942). She also was a dancer in vaudeville.

Walters died on March 15, 1994, in New York City at the age of 81.

Filmography

Film

References

External links 

Rotten Tomatoes profile

1915 births
2001 deaths
People from New York City
Actresses from New York City
American film actresses
20th-century American actresses